Sarayköy railway station is a railway station in Sarayköy, Turkey. TCDD Taşımacılık operates daily regional rail service from İzmir to Denizli, a total of seven trains a day in each direction. Sarayköy was opened on 1 July 1882 by the Ottoman Railway Company.

References

External links
TCDD Taşımacılık - Official site

Railway stations in Denizli Province
Railway stations opened in 1882
1882 establishments in the Ottoman Empire